Daniele Giovanardi (born 15 January 1950) is an Italian former sprinter (400 metres) and hurdles (400 metres hs).

Daniele is brother of Carlo Giovanardi, a politician.

Biography
He competed in the 1972 Summer Olympics.

National titles
1 win in 400 metres hurdles at the Italian Athletics Championships (1973)

See also
 Italy national relay team

References

External links
 

1950 births
Living people
Sportspeople from Modena
Italian male hurdlers
Italian male sprinters
Olympic athletes of Italy
Athletes (track and field) at the 1972 Summer Olympics
Mediterranean Games gold medalists for Italy
Athletes (track and field) at the 1971 Mediterranean Games
Mediterranean Games medalists in athletics